Plutarchia is a genus of flowering plants belonging to the family Ericaceae.

It is native to Colombia and Ecuador.
 
The genus name of Plutarchia is in honour of Plutarch (c. 45 – c. 125), a Greek Middle Platonist philosopher, historian, biographer, essayist, and priest at the Temple of Apollo in Delphi. 
It was first described and published in Bull. Torrey Bot. Club Vol.63 on page 311 in 1936.

Known species
According to Kew:
Plutarchia angulata 
Plutarchia coronaria 
Plutarchia dasyphylla 
Plutarchia dichogama 
Plutarchia dolos 
Plutarchia ecuadorensis 
Plutarchia guascensis 
Plutarchia minor 
Plutarchia miranda 
Plutarchia monantha 
Plutarchia pubiflora 
Plutarchia rigida

References

Ericaceae
Ericaceae genera
Plants described in 1936
Flora of Colombia
Flora of Ecuador